USS Might (PG-94) was laid down as Canadian corvette CN-312 by Morton Engineering and Drydock Co., Ltd., Quebec, Canada, on 28 November 1941 and launched as HMS Musk on 15 July 1942. The ship was transferred to the United States Navy on 20 July 1942, renamed Might on 14 August 1942, and commissioned at Quebec on 22 December 1942.

Service history
After fitting out and shakedown from Boston, Might reported to the Eastern Sea Frontier on 10 March 1943 at New York City for convoy escort duty. Sailing primarily to Cuba and occasionally to Key West, she continued this duty after transferring to the Coast Guard on 27 June.

During the next 18 months, Might completed 21 voyages to Cuba and two to Key West. The protection she provided made it possible for this vital coastwise and Caribbean traffic to continue despite German submarine menace and freed larger destroyer types for the hunter-killer operations which defeated the U‑boats in the Atlantic. In November 1944, and continuously from 9 January to 1 May 1945, Might served week-long barrier patrols in the western Atlantic.

After anti-submarine exercises out of her Staten Island base, Might arrived Charleston, S.C., on 28 June and decommissioned there on 9 October 1945. Her name was struck from the Navy list on 24 October 1945, and she was delivered to the Maritime Commission on 18 October 1946 for immediate transfer to her purchaser, United Boat Service Corp., City Island, N.Y.

Post-war
From 1950 to 1956 she was owned as Olympic Explorer by Balleneros Ltd., S.A., Panama, and sailed as a commercial whale chaser. Then sold to a Japanese shipping company, she was renamed Otori Maru No. 3, and in 1957 was renamed Kyo Marti No. 12.

References

External links
USS Might
NavSource Online: Gunboat Photo Archive - Might (PG 94) ex-HMS Musk (K 289) ex-CN-312

World War II naval ships of the United States
Ships built in Quebec
1942 ships
Might